The Lisbon Metropolitan Area (abbreviated as AML) is a metropolitan area in Portugal centered on Lisbon, the capital and largest city of the country. The metropolitan area, covering 18 municipalities is the largest urban area in the country and the 10th largest in the European Union, with a population in 2015 of 2,812,678 in an area of 3,015.24 km².

The Lisbon Metropolitan Area has the largest GDP (€76.4 billion) of any metropolitan area in Portugal. The region is home to the largest tech hub in the country and a majority of Portugal's major multinational corporations by revenue are based there.

History 
Portugal has been through a period of administrative changes since the 1974 revolution. More recently, new standards of territorial administration have been implemented to match European Union criteria.

After some years of indefinitions, municipalities are now associated in metropolitan areas or intermunicipal communities. These new regional divisions are colliding with the traditional Portuguese regional structures: Distritos (Districts). Districts were implemented in the 19th century by Mouzinho da Silveira after the Liberal Revolution of 1820, to replace clerical dioceses (which held the intermediate authority between the absolute monarchy and the municipalities), and still are the official regional authorities in Portugal, thus leaving the new metropolitan authorities with no authority at all. For instance, the District of Lisbon and the District of Setubal collide and interfere with the Lisbon metropolitan area authority. Each District is ruled by a governador civil (civil governor). These governors are empowered by the Prime Minister of Portugal and have most of the administrative power over the municipalities comprised, leaving the metropolitan areas with a passive status and communitarian tasks.

As an administrative entity, the Lisbon metropolitan area was only created in 1991 in order to meet the needs of urban territories with a large population density surrounding the Portuguese capital. 

To definitely end with these anomalies, a national Referendum was held on November 8, 1998, in order to approve a new regionalization (Referendo à Regionalização), which was rejected by over 60% of the voting population on account of disagreements over the loss of sovereignty of some districts to others (e.g. by the time of the referendum it was not known where the seat of government of the new "Estremadura & Ribatejo" region would be, which was a fusion of the District of Leiria with the District of Santarém, Leiria and Santarém being cities of the same size and importance).

The Regionalization experiment in Portugal was only successful among insular regions like in 1976, when the districts of Angra do Heroísmo, Horta and Ponta Delgada were substituted by the Autonomous Region of Açores with the seat of government being in Ponta Delgada, while the district of Funchal was replaced by the Autonomous Region of Madeira with a seat of government in Funchal.

Overview
The Lisbon metropolitan area, centered in the Portuguese capital city of Lisbon, is the largest population concentration in Portugal. The population in 2011 was 2,821,876, of whom 547,733 (19.4%) live in the city of Lisbon. About 26.7% of the total population of Portugal lives in the Lisbon metropolitan area. The area of the Lisbon metropolitan area is 3,015.24 km2, which is 3.3% of the total area of Portugal.

The Lisbon metropolitan area has an active population of about 1.3 million people. With 32.7% of the national employment being located in its territory, the contribution of AML for the gross domestic product surpasses 36%.

Today, the Lisbon metropolitan area territory is almost the same as Lisbon Region territory, being AML a union of metropolitan municipalities, and Lisbon Region a NUTS II region.

It is bordered by the Oeste Intermunicipal Community (Central Region) to the north, Lezíria do Tejo to the northeast, Alentejo Central to the east and by Alentejo Litoral to the south, the former ones belonging to the wider Alentejo region.

The municipalities north of the Tagus River are from Lisbon District (Grande Lisboa); those south of the river are from Setubal District (Península de Setúbal).

Structure
The metropolitan area of Lisbon was a semiofficial structure. Recently, Portugal has been incrementing the powers held by these territorial organization organs. In the officialization of the Lisbon Great Metropolitan Area, Azambuja left due to being mostly a rustic zone, more kindred to the city of Santarém which lies just 23 km northeast, while Lisbon is 45 km away from Azambuja, southeast.

In the official AML site is said:

As stated on the law 10/2003, of the 13 of May, the Grande Área Metropolitana de Lisboa (Lisbon Great Metropolitan Area) is a public collective person of associative nature, and of territorial scope that aims to reach common public interests of the municipalities that integrate it, that includes (18 City Halls) – Alcochete, Almada, Barreiro, Cascais, Lisboa, Loures, Mafra, Moita, Montijo, Odivelas, Oeiras, Palmela, Sesimbra, Setúbal, Seixal, Sintra and Vila Franca de Xira.

The Grande Área Metropolitana de Lisboa was constituted, by public scripture, in 2004, and published on 5 July 2004, in the III series of the Diário da República. It is composed by three organs: ·

Junta Metropolitana, executive organ, composed by the 18 presidents of the city halls that it integrates. They elect among themselves, a president and two vice presidents.

Assembleia Metropolitana, legislative organ, composed by the chosen representatives in the municipal assembly of the city halls, in odd number, over the triple the number of the towns that it integrates, in a maximum of 55.

Conselho Metropolitano, consultative organ, composed by representatives of the state and by the members of the Junta Metropolitana.

Municipalities

See also
 Tourism in Lisbon
 Àrea Metropolitana de Barcelona
 LisboaViva

References

External links 

Official website 

Lisbon
Metropolitan Area
Metropolitan Area